Miga may refer to:
 Miga, Nigeria, the Local Government Area of Jigawa State
 Miga, Poland, a village
 One of Miga, Quatchi, Sumi and Mukmuk, mascots of the 2010 Winter Olympic Games
 The Multilateral Investment Guarantee Agency (MIGA), an organization within the World Bank Group

See also